The North Star is a 2016 film about slavery and the underground railroad.

See also
 List of films featuring slavery

References 

2016 films
Films about slavery
2016 drama films
Works about the Underground Railroad